In physics or engineering education, a Fermi problem, Fermi quiz, Fermi question, Fermi estimate, order-of-magnitude problem, order-of-magnitude estimate, or order estimation is an estimation problem designed to teach dimensional analysis or approximation of extreme scientific calculations, and such a problem is usually a back-of-the-envelope calculation. The estimation technique is named after physicist Enrico Fermi as he was known for his ability to make good approximate calculations with little or no actual data. Fermi problems typically involve making justified guesses about quantities and their variance or lower and upper bounds. In some cases, order-of-magnitude estimates can also be derived using dimensional analysis.

Historical background 
An example is Enrico Fermi's estimate of the strength of the atomic bomb that detonated at the Trinity test, based on the distance traveled by pieces of paper he dropped from his hand during the blast. Fermi's estimate of 10 kilotons of TNT was well within an order of magnitude of the now-accepted value of 21 kilotons.

Examples
Fermi questions are often extreme in nature, and cannot usually be solved using common mathematical or scientific information.

Example questions given by the official Fermi Competition:

Possibly the most famous Fermi Question is the Drake equation, which seeks to estimate the number of intelligent civilizations in the galaxy. The basic question of why, if there were a significant number of such civilizations, ours has never encountered any others is called the Fermi paradox.

Advantages and scope
Scientists often look for Fermi estimates of the answer to a problem before turning to more sophisticated methods to calculate a precise answer. This provides a useful check on the results. While the estimate is almost certainly incorrect, it is also a simple calculation that allows for easy error checking, and to find faulty assumptions if the figure produced is far beyond what we might reasonably expect. By contrast, precise calculations can be extremely complex but with the expectation that the answer they produce is correct. The far larger number of factors and operations involved can obscure a very significant error, either in mathematical process or in the assumptions the equation is based on, but the result may still be assumed to be right because it has been derived from a precise formula that is expected to yield good results. Without a reasonable frame of reference to work from it is seldom clear if a result is acceptably precise or is many degrees of magnitude (tens or hundreds of times) too big or too small. The Fermi estimation gives a quick, simple way to obtain this frame of reference for what might reasonably be expected to be the answer.

As long as the initial assumptions in the estimate are reasonable quantities, the result obtained will give an answer within the same scale as the correct result, and if not gives a base for understanding why this is the case. For example, suppose you were asked to determine the number of piano tuners in Chicago. 
If your initial estimate told you there should be a hundred or so, but the precise answer tells you there are many thousands, then you know you need to find out why there is this divergence from the expected result. First looking for errors, then for factors the estimation didn't take account of – Does Chicago have a number of music schools or other places with a disproportionately high ratio of pianos to people? Whether close or very far from the observed results, the context the estimation provides gives useful information both about the process of calculation and the assumptions that have been used to look at problems.

Fermi estimates are also useful in approaching problems where the optimal choice of calculation method depends on the expected size of the answer. For instance, a Fermi estimate might indicate whether the internal stresses of a structure are low enough that it can be accurately described by linear elasticity; or if the estimate already bears significant relationship in scale relative to some other value, for example, if a structure will be over-engineered to withstand loads several times greater than the estimate.

Although Fermi calculations are often not accurate, as there may be many problems with their assumptions, this sort of analysis does tell us what to look for to get a better answer. For the above example, we might try to find a better estimate of the number of pianos tuned by a piano tuner in a typical day, or look up an accurate number for the population of Chicago.  It also gives us a rough estimate that may be good enough for some purposes: if we want to start a store in Chicago that sells piano tuning equipment, and we calculate that we need 10,000 potential customers to stay in business, we can reasonably assume that the above estimate is far enough below 10,000 that we should consider a different business plan (and, with a little more work, we could compute a rough upper bound on the number of piano tuners by considering the most extreme reasonable values that could appear in each of our assumptions).

Explanation 
Fermi estimates generally work because the estimations of the individual terms are often close to correct, and overestimates and underestimates help cancel each other out. That is, if there is no consistent bias, a Fermi calculation that involves the multiplication of several estimated factors (such as the number of piano tuners in Chicago) will probably be more accurate than might be first supposed.

In discrete terms, the number of overestimates minus underestimates will have a binomial distribution.

Thus one will expect to be within  to 8 times the correct value – within an order of magnitude, and much less than the worst case of erring by a factor of 29 = 512 (about 2.71 orders of magnitude). If one has a shorter chain or estimates more accurately, the overall estimate will be correspondingly better.

See also 
 Guesstimate
 Dead reckoning
 Handwaving
 Heuristic
 Orders of approximation
 Stein's example
 Spherical cow
 Drake equation

Notes and references

Further reading

The following books contain many examples of Fermi problems with solutions:
 John Harte, Consider a Spherical Cow: A Course in Environmental Problem Solving University Science Books.  1988. .
 John Harte, Consider a Cylindrical Cow: More Adventures in Environmental Problem Solving University Science Books.  2001. .
 Clifford Swartz, Back-of-the-Envelope Physics Johns Hopkins University Press.  2003. . .
 Lawrence Weinstein & John A. Adam, Guesstimation: Solving the World's Problems on the Back of a Cocktail Napkin Princeton University Press.  2008. . .  A textbook on Fermi problems.
 Aaron Santos, How Many Licks?: Or, How to Estimate Damn Near Anything. Running Press. 2009. . .
 Sanjoy Mahajan, Street-Fighting Mathematics: The Art of Educated Guessing and Opportunistic Problem Solving MIT Press. 2010.  . . 
 Göran Grimvall, Quantify! A Crash Course in Smart Thinking Johns Hopkins University Press. 2010.  . . 
 Lawrence Weinstein, Guesstimation 2.0: Solving Today's Problems on the Back of a Napkin Princeton University Press. 2012.  . 
 Sanjoy Mahajan, The Art of Insight in Science and Engineering MIT Press. 2014. .
 Dmitry Budker, Alexander O. Sushkov, Physics on your feet. Berkeley Graduate Exam Questions   Oxford University Press. 2015. .
 Rob Eastaway, Maths on the Back of an Envelope: Clever ways to (roughly) calculate anything  HarperCollins. 2019. .

External links
 The University of Maryland Physics Education Group maintains a collection of Fermi problems.
 Fermi Questions: A Guide for Teachers, Students, and Event Supervisors by Lloyd Abrams.
 "What if? Paint the Earth" from the book What if? Serious Scientific Answers to Absurd Hypothetical Questions by Randall Munroe.
 An example of a Fermi Problem relating to total gasoline consumed by cars since the invention of cars and comparison to the output of the energy released by the sun.
 "Introduction to Fermi estimates" by Nuño Sempere, which has a proof sketch of why Fermi-style decompositions produce better estimates.
 "How should mathematics be taught to non-mathematicians?" by Timothy Gowers.

There are or have been a number of university-level courses devoted to estimation and the solution of Fermi problems.  The materials for these courses are a good source for additional Fermi problem examples and material about solution strategies:
  6.055J / 2.038J The Art of Approximation in Science and Engineering taught by Sanjoy Mahajan at the Massachusetts Institute of Technology (MIT).
  Physics on the Back of an Envelope taught by Lawrence Weinstein at Old Dominion University.
  Order of Magnitude Physics taught by Sterl Phinney at the California Institute of Technology.
  Order of Magnitude Estimation taught by Patrick Chuang at the University of California, Santa Cruz.
  Order of Magnitude Problem Solving taught by Linda Strubbe at the University of Toronto.
  Order of Magnitude Physics taught by Eugene Chiang at the University of California, Berkeley.
  Chapter 2: Discoveries on the Back of an Envelope from Frontiers of Science: Scientific Habits of Mind taught by David Helfand at Columbia University.

Physics education
Dimensional analysis
Problem